Mathew Flathers (Matthew; alias Major) (c. 1580 – 21 March 1607) was an English Roman Catholic priest. He is a Catholic martyr, beatified in 1987.

Life
Born at Weston, West Riding of Yorkshire, Flathers was educated at Douai and ordained at Arras on 25 March 1606. Three months later he was sent to the English mission, but was discovered almost immediately by the agents of the Government; after the Gunpowder Plot, the English state was particularly active in hunting down Catholic priests.

He was brought to trial, under the statute of 27 Elizabeth, on the charge of receiving orders abroad, and condemned to death. By an act of clemency, this sentence was commuted to banishment for life; but after a brief exile, Flathers returned to England and his mission. After ministering for a short time to Catholics in Yorkshire, he was again apprehended.

Brought to trial at York on the charge of being ordained abroad and exercising priestly functions in England, Flathers was offered his life on condition that he take the recently enacted Oath of Allegiance. On his refusal, he was condemned to death and taken to the common place of execution outside Micklegate Bar, York, where he was hanged, drawn, and quartered.

References

Attribution

1580 births
1607 deaths
English beatified people
People executed by Stuart England by hanging, drawing and quartering
17th-century venerated Christians
17th-century Roman Catholic martyrs
16th-century English Roman Catholic priests
17th-century English clergy
People from the Borough of Harrogate
Executed people from North Yorkshire
Eighty-five martyrs of England and Wales